Welch Rocks are two rocks  north of Welch Island in the east part of Holme Bay, Mac. Robertson Land. Plotted from photos taken from ANARE (Australian National Antarctic Research Expeditions) aircraft in 1958 and 1959. Named by Antarctic Names Committee of Australia (ANCA) after Welch Island.

References

Rock formations of Mac. Robertson Land